Excello can refer to:

 Excello Records, a record label
 Excello, Missouri, a community in Missouri
 Excello, Ohio, a community in Ohio
 Mastermind Excello (disambiguation), fictional superheroes
 The Excellos, the original name of the band The Zodiacs